Knut Astrup Wang (4 May 1929 – 12 November 2011) was a Norwegian sailor. He was born in Oslo. He competed at the 1960 Summer Olympics in Rome, where placed seventh in the 5.5 Metre class, together with Finn Ferner and Odd Harsheim.

References

External links 
 

1929 births
2011 deaths
Sportspeople from Oslo
Norwegian male sailors (sport)
Olympic sailors of Norway
Sailors at the 1960 Summer Olympics – 5.5 Metre